Richard Clewer (fl. 1385–1390) of Bath, Somerset, was an English burgess who briefly sat in two 14th century parliaments of the Kingdom of England. 

He was a Member (MP) of the Parliament of England for Bath in 1385 and January 1390.

References

Year of birth missing
Year of death missing
English MPs 1385
English MPs January 1390
14th-century English politicians
People from Bath, Somerset